"Ginger Bread" is a song written by Clint Ballard, Jr. and Hank Hunter and performed by Frankie Avalon. The song reached #9 on the Billboard Top 100, #10 on the R&B chart, and #30 in the UK in 1958.

The song was arranged by Peter De Angelis.  The backing vocals on the song was by the band The Four Dates.

The song was ranked #100 on Billboard magazine's Top Hot 100 songs of 1958.

Other versions
Rusty Draper released a version as the B-side to his single "By the Light of the Silvery Moon" in Australia in 1958.
Johnny Worth released a version as the B-side to his single "Western Movies" in the UK in 1958.

References

External links 
 Listen to Ginger Bread on YouTube

1958 songs
1958 singles
Songs written by Clint Ballard Jr.
Frankie Avalon songs
Mercury Records singles
Chancellor Records singles